The  is an archaeological site containing two separate groups of early to middle Kofun period burial tumulii located in what is now part of the city of Myōkō, Niigata in the Hokuriku region of Japan. The site was designated a National Historic Site of Japan in 1978.

Overview

The Kannondaira Site contains three groups of approximately 53 tumuli, including one keyhole-shaped tomb dating from the 3rd century. Most of the tombs are dome-shaped, although one is scallop-shaped and some are square-shaped, indicating that the site is from a transitional period between the Yayoi period and the Kofun period. Haniwa and fukiishi have been recovered from the area. No grave goods were found in this tomb.

The Tenjindō Site also consists of three groups of tumuli, of which 188 have thus far been catalogued, making it one of the largest sites in Niigata Prefecture. The site has been repeatedly excavated by Tokyo University. Grave goods recovered include Sue ware, bronze mirrors, straight iron swords, parts of armor, horse fittings and items of jewellery. From these grave goods, it is estimated that these tumuli were constructed from the late 5th century to the late 6th century.

The two sites flank a large moated late Yayoi period to early Kofun-period settlement, the Hida Site, which has a separate National Historic Site designation. The Kannondaira cluster is to the north, and the Tenjindō cluster is to the south, and these areas may have been the necropolis for this settlement. As the area was mostly covered in forest, the state of preservation was relatively good, although even in 1976 it had been reported that a number of the known kofun has been destroyed due to urban encroachment, road construction, landslides and robbery. After the designation as a National Historic Site, the area has been cleared and opened to the public as an archaeological park,  with a small museum to display some of the artifacts found.

See also
List of Historic Sites of Japan (Niigata)

References

External links
 Myōkō city official home page 

Kofun
History of Niigata Prefecture
Myōkō, Niigata
Historic Sites of Japan
Archaeological sites in Japan